Dmitri Nikolayevich Barinov (born 11 September 1996) is a Russian professional footballer who plays as a midfielder for Lokomotiv Moscow and the Russia national team.

Club career
Born in Moscow Oblast, Barinov started playing football in his hometown region, before joining football school Master-Saturn Yegoryevsk in 2010. In 2012, Lokomotiv Moscow signed Barinov, and he started training with main squad after just one year.

On 16 May 2015, he made his professional debut for Lokomotiv Moscow in a 3-0 win against FC Rubin Kazan in Russian Premier League.

International career
He won the 2013 UEFA European Under-17 Championship with Russia, scoring in the semifinal penalty shootout against Sweden. He also participated in the 2013 FIFA U-17 World Cup. Later, he represented Russia national under-19 football team at the 2015 UEFA European Under-19 Championship, where Russia came in second place, and he was selected to the team of the tournament.

He made his debut for the senior Russia national football team on 8 June 2019 in a Euro 2020 qualifier against San Marino, as a 73rd-minute substitute for Roman Zobnin.

On 11 May 2021, he was included in the preliminary extended 30-man squad for UEFA Euro 2020. On 2 June 2021, he was included in the final squad. He started Russia's opening game against Belgium on 12 June 2021 and was substituted at half-time as Russia lost 0–3. He played the full match in Russia's second game against Finland on 16 June in a 1–0 victory. He did not appear in Russia's last group game against Denmark as Russia lost 1–4 and was eliminated.

Career statistics

Club

International

Honours
Lokomotiv Moscow
Russian Premier League: 2017–18
Russian Cup: 2016–17, 2018–19, 2020–21
Russian Super Cup: 2019

Russia U17
UEFA European Under-17 Championship: 2013

Russia U19
UEFA European Under-19 Championship runner-up: 2015

References

External links
 
 

1996 births
Living people
People from Shchyolkovsky District
Russian footballers
Russia youth international footballers
Russia under-21 international footballers
Russia international footballers
Association football defenders
Association football midfielders
FC Lokomotiv Moscow players
Russian Premier League players
UEFA Euro 2020 players
Sportspeople from Moscow Oblast